The Testament is the third studio album by Queensbridge rapper Cormega. The album was originally recorded as Cormega's debut album in the mid-1990s, and scheduled for a release on Def Jam, but was eventually shelved. Cormega, after many years, was finally able to obtain the masters to the album, and released it on his own Legal Hustle imprint in 2005.

The title track appeared on a CD-sampler celebrating the 10 years of Def Jam Recordings, this release lists The Testament original release date to have been September 1, 1998.

Track listing

Charts

References 

2005 albums
Cormega albums
Albums produced by Havoc (musician)